Pacific International Lines (PIL) is a shipping company incorporated in Singapore on 16 March 1967. It was founded by Singaporean entrepreneur Chang Yun Chung, who was the world's oldest billionaire until he died at 102 in September 2020.

History
When the company was founded in March 1967, the company originally operated just two ships, but constantly expanded to finally celebrate its first 50 years of history in 2017, and ranking within the first 10 largest container shipping lines.

In March 2015, PIL partially took over the ownership of Singapore's Mariana Express Lines (MELL). According to the deal, PIL assumed the majority shareholding. MELL has continued to operate under its own brand and pre-existing business, as agreed internally at the time of the purchase.

In June 2017, PIL and COSCO entered into a mutual chartering agreement, to supply and exchange vessels during shipping demand peak times.

In February 2018, as forerunner in IT improvements, PIL has implemented a blockchain supply platform to share established data with DP World - Port of Singapore via IBM systems.

Fleet 
PIL has a fleet of around 95 vessels (container, dry bulk, multi-purpose vessels) with a capacity of more than 400,000 twenty-foot equivalent units (TEUs). PIL has also taken delivery of 12 vessels of 11,800 TEU.
The company employs over 18,000 staff globally, regularly serving about 500 ports in nearly 100 countries worldwide.

See also
List of largest container shipping companies

References

External links

Official website

1967 establishments in Singapore
Transport companies established in 1967
Shipping companies of Singapore
Container shipping companies
Singaporean brands